Silber is a surname, originally the German word meaning silver. It may refer to:

Notable people named Silber
Alexandra Silber (born 1983), American actor, singer, writer, and educator
Christoph Silber (born 1971), German-born British film producer, screenwriter, and director
Christopher Silber (born 1973), American television writer and producer
Eddie Silber (1914–1976), American baseball player
Irwin Silber (1925–2010), American writer, editor, publisher, historian, folk-song collector, and political activist
Jane Silber (born ?), American chief executive, computer scientist, and artificial intelligence technologist
Joan Silber (born ?), American novelist
John Silber (1926–2012), American academician, politician, philosophy professor, and university president
Jules C. Silber (1885–?), German WWI spy, autobiographer, and interpreter
Laura Silber (born ?), American professor, foundation executive, and writer
Marianne Rafferty (née Silber; born 1971), American television news anchor and journalist
Mary Silber (born ?), American statistical science professor, mathematician, and physicist
Max I. Silber (1911–2004), American Scouting promoter and enthusiast, ingot manufacturer, and businessman
Mitchell D. Silber (born 1970), American political risk, intelligence, and security analyst, and television commentator
Otto Silber (1893–1940), Estonian footballer and Olympics competitor
Sherman Silber (born ?), American urologist, microsurgeon, inventor, and infertility specialist
Stephen Silber (born 1944), British judge
William L. Silber (born ?), American economist, professor, and writer

Fictional characters
Katrina Silber, minor character in Buffy the Vampire Slayer
 Silber, a character in the Buriki One video game series

See also 
Silberman
Silver (disambiguation)
Silverman
Zilber

German-language surnames
Jewish surnames
Yiddish-language surnames